Ishaq Isa Abedeen (born 1 January 1988 in Kenya) is a Bahraini runner.

Achievements

External links

1988 births
Living people
Bahraini male long-distance runners
Kenyan emigrants to Bahrain
Naturalized citizens of Bahrain
Kenyan male long-distance runners